Nicolae Leonard (born Leonard Nae 13 December 1886, Bădălan – 24 December 1928, Câmpulung, Romania) was a Romanian opera tenor, nicknamed "the Prince of the Operetta".

Notes

References

1886 births
1928 deaths
Romanian operatic tenors
People from Galați
Bogdan Petriceicu Hasdeu National College alumni
20th-century Romanian male opera singers